Ormocarpopsis itremoensis is a species of flowering plant in the family Fabaceae. It is found only in Madagascar.

References

itremoensis
Endemic flora of Madagascar
Endangered flora of Africa
Taxonomy articles created by Polbot